Pseudoliotina is a genus of small sea snails, marine gastropod mollusks in the family Skeneidae.

Species
Species within the genus Pseudoliotina include:
 †Pseudoliotina mcleani Sohl, 1998: fossil species from the Maastrichtian in Puerto Rico, Cretaceous
 †Pseudoliotina sensuyi (Vidal, 1921)
 †Pseudoliotina stinnesbecki Kiel & Bandel, 2002
Synonyms
 Pseudoliotina discoidea (Reeve, 1843): synonym of Rotaliotina discoidea (Reeve, 1843) (superseded combination)
 Pseudoliotina springsteeni McLean, 1988: synonym of Rotaliotina springsteeni (McLean, 1988) superseded combination)

References

 Cossmann, M. (1925). Essais de paléoconchologie comparée, Treizième livraison. Paris: Presses Universitaires de France. 345 pp., 11 plates.
  Huang, Shih-I. (2023). Nomenclatural notes on fossil liotiid taxa and description of Cyclostrema filipino n. sp. from the Philippines (Mollusca: Gastropoda, Liotiidae). Bulletin of Malacology, Taiwan. 46: 24-46.

External links
 To GenBank 
 To World Register of Marine Species

 
Skeneidae